Tomasz Kulawik (born 4 May 1969) is a Polish former professional footballer and current coach. He was most recently the manager of MKS Kluczbork.

Club career
Kulawik was born in Olkusz. On the field, he played as a midfielder. In the Ekstraklasa, he played for Zaglebie Sosnowiec, Wisła Kraków, and Ruch Chorzow whom he played for 257 times and scored 37 goals. With Wisła Kraków he won the Ekstraklasa championship twice, in the 1998–99 and 2000–01 seasons. In addition, he contributed to the winning of the Polish Cup in 2001–02, Polish Supercup in 2001 and League Cup in 2000–01.

International career
Kulawik made two appearances for the Poland national team during 1998.

Coaching career
After finishing his playing career, he joined the coaching staff of Wisła Kraków. After the dismissal of Jerzy Engel in 2005, he became a new coach of Wisła Kraków. Then he was the coach of Wisła Kraków reserve team and youth team in the Młoda Ekstraklasa.

Honours

As a player
Wisła Kraków
Ekstraklasa: 1998–99, 2000–01
Polish Cup: 2001–02
Ekstraklasa Cup: 2000–01
Polish SuperCup: 2001

As a coach
Wisła Kraków (ME)
 Młoda Ekstraklasa: 2007–08

Individual
UEFA Cup top goalscorer: 1998–99

References

External links
Profile at Historia Wisły

1969 births
Living people
People from Olkusz
Sportspeople from Lesser Poland Voivodeship
Polish footballers
Association football midfielders
Poland international footballers
Zagłębie Sosnowiec players
Wisła Kraków players
Ruch Chorzów players
Polish football managers
Wisła Kraków managers
Olimpia Zambrów managers